Pluzhne is a selo in Shepetivka Raion, Khmelnytskyi Oblast  (province), Ukraine. The village is located on the river Ustya, 24 km away from the city of Iziaslav, 44 km away from Shepetivka and 127 km away from Khmelnytskyi. Pluzhne hosts the administration of Pluzhne rural hromada, one of the hromadas of Ukraine. Population is 3,297 inhabitants (as of 2001).

Until 18 July 2020, Pluzhne belonged to Iziaslav Raion. The raion was abolished in July 2020 as part of the administrative reform of Ukraine, which reduced the number of raions of Khmelnytskyi Oblast to three. The area of Iziaslav Raion was merged into Shepetivka Raion.

Historical demographics of Pluzhne 

As of 1978, the village's population is 5600

Gallery

References

External links 
 Weather in the village Pluzhne 
 Passport Pluzhnenskoyi Village Council Information on 2011-01-01 
 The murder of the Jews of Pluzhne during World War II, at Yad Vashem website.

Holocaust locations in Ukraine
Populated places established in 1576
Villages in Sheptivka Raion